SwimSwam news is a swimming news organization covering competitive swimming along with diving, water polo and synchronized swimming. SwimSwam launched as a website in March 2012 and quickly became the most-read swimming website in the world. SwimSwam was named one of NBC Sports's 100 must-follow social media handles for the 2016 Summer Olympics.

History
The news organization was founded by Braden Keith, Garrett McCaffrey, Davis Wuolle, Tiffany Stewart and Olympic gold medalist Melvin Stewart, known as Gold Medal Mel. The group of founders teamed up in October 2011, started the SwimSwam YouTube channel on February 17, 2012, and launched the SwimSwam website March 12, 2012. While the website was launched in 2012, its origins trace back to swimming website SwimNetwork.com where Mel Stewart had worked as a traffic driver and blogger. The roots of the YouTube channel can also be traced to SwimNetwork.com, where in 2010 Stewart was the host of an interview show. After USA Swimming shut SwimNetwork.com down, it was launched in 2006 and shut down a few years later, Stewart took his experience and brought his wife and collaborators together to found SwimSwam.

In its first month of operation, the website received more unique visitors than the USA Swimming and Swimming World websites, coming in at over 200,000 unique views. As of July 2021, the videos SwimSwam had published on its YouTube channel had amassed over 19 million views.

Four years after the initial launch of the website and the start of the YouTube channel, Keith and Stewart spearheaded the launch of a print magazine taking some of the first hard copy issues to the 2016 US Olympic Trials to increase brand recognition. Headquarters at time of launch were located in Austin, Texas, though workers were spread throughout multiple states.

Operations

Website

Articles
Writers publishing articles on swimswam.com are composed both of staff writers and topical contributors. Typically, the website publishes 20 to 100 articles per month. On November 10, 2021, SwimSwam published its landmark 100,000th post on its official website.

Listings and rankings
The site also compiles a listing of swim-related jobs and ranks NCAA recruits and recruiting classes, among other things. SwimSwam's online job listings section has been noted for its ease of use and streamlining the job application, interview, and hiring process.

YouTube channel
On SwimSwam’s YouTube channel, videos published cover aquatics sports-related content including sports such as pool and open water swimming, synchronized swimming, diving, and water polo. It produces a podcast, "SwimSwam Podcast", in which different staff members interview key people in aquatics sports including athletes, coaches, and administrators. SwimSwam provided timely coverage breaking down the rationale of the decision by USA Swimming to postpone the 2020 US Olympic Trials in swimming a year and break the meet into two waves due to the COVID-19 pandemic in the form of a podcast featuring different SwimSwam staff members, including two co-founders.

Magazine
In 2016, SwimSwam launched a quarterly print magazine called SwimSwam magazine, which was included in Mr. Magazine's "30 Hottest New Launches of the Year."

Awards 
SwimSwam is known for its yearly Swammy Awards, which honor the top international, NCAA and age group swimmers at the end of each year. Swammy Awards allocated annually also highlight athletes in different aquatics disciplines, such as swimmers in open water swimming. They are also awarded on the continental and national level to swimmers and coaches, such as swimmer of the year of Africa, by gender, and coach of the year of the United States.

Notable stories
The following are a few of the notable stories SwimSwam has reported on or been a part of that were covered by other news agencies:
 SwimSwam made international headlines when it published statistical data suggesting the pool used for the 2016 Summer Olympics was affected by currents that unfairly advantaged some lanes over others. The original SwimSwam report was picked up and reported on by The Washington Post, Deadspin, Australia's News.com.au and Inside Science.

 The organization's website was also the outlet in which G Ryan, a national champion swimmer, came out as transgender in 2016.

 In 2018, the United States Air Force Academy highlighted SwimSwam's rankings of college swimming and diving teams for their holistic approach to ranking programs.

 Between 2019 and 2021, SwimSwam provided coverage of high profile swimmer-swimmer and swimmer-coach couple engagements including Lexie Lupton to Ryan Held, Pernille Blume to Florent Manaudou, Alec Connolly to Erika Brown, Meghan Haila to Caeleb Dressel, United States Marine Sean Dowling to Kathleen Baker, Federica Pellegrini to Matteo Giunta, Florian Wellbrock to Sarah Köhler, and Ferry Weertman to Ranomi Kromowidjojo.

 On January 11, 2021, SwimSwam was the first media outlet to report that retired U.S. Olympic gold medalist swimmer Klete Keller had been a participant in the 2021 storming of the United States Capitol. Specifically, SwimSwam played a critical role in identifying Keller from video footage posted online of the event.

 SwimSwam's Olympic coverage has also been referenced by The Washington Post, Slate (magazine), Bleacher Report and Sports Illustrated. As part of press coverage of competitive swimming events leading up to the 2020 US Olympic Trials, NBC Sports deferred authority to SwimSwam as to where Katie Ledecky and Simone Manuel were expected to compete. SwimSwam was also highlighted by a local news outlet, Anchorage Daily News, in a referee context when the state of Alaska qualified its first swimmer to a Summer Olympic Games in June 2021 for the 2020 Summer Olympics. The International Olympic Committee called upon SwimSwam's coverage of Australian swimmer Kaylee McKeown twice in one article to provide context for her potential heading into the 2020 Olympic Games.

SwimSwam was the first to report on Lia Thomas, a transgender woman who was subject to controversy over her participation on the University of Pennsylvania women's swim team after competing on the men's team for three years.  In addition, SwimSwam also was the first media company to conduct a formal interview with Thomas via their SwimSwam podcast (Thomas, who had declined to speak to multiple media outlets, only spoke with Sports Illustrated after her SwimSwam interview).

References

External links
 

American sport websites
Swimming websites
Water polo websites
Internet properties established in 2012